Byron Todd Jones (born May 23, 1957) is an American lawyer who was the seventh director of the Bureau of Alcohol, Tobacco, Firearms and Explosives (ATF) and is chief disciplinary officer of the National Football League (NFL). He twice served as United States Attorney for the District of Minnesota.

Early life and education

Jones attended Wyoming High School in Cincinnati, Ohio. He received his Bachelor of Arts degree from Macalester College in 1979 and his Juris Doctor from the University of Minnesota Law School in 1983.

Career
After his schooling, Jones joined the U.S. Marine Corps and went on to serve as an infantry officer with the 1st Marine Division. Jones later became a judge advocate as both a trial defense counsel and prosecutor. He left active duty in 1989. From 1992 to 1994 and 1997 to 1998, Jones served as an assistant U.S. Attorney.

ATF
Jones became acting director of the ATF on August 31, 2011, following the resignation of Kenneth E. Melson in the aftermath of the ATF gunwalking scandal.

On January 16, 2013, U.S. President Barack Obama nominated Jones to serve as permanent director of the ATF. Due to opposition from gun rights lobbies, the ATF had not had a permanent director since the position was made subject to U.S. Senate approval in 2006. 

On July 31, the Senate confirmed him as head of the ATF. On March 20, 2015, the Bureau of Alcohol, Tobacco, Firearms and Explosives announced Jones will depart to pursue opportunities in the private sector, with his resignation to become effective on March 31, 2015.

NFL
On March 23, 2015, NFL commissioner Roger Goodell announced to team owners that he was appointing Jones as the league's new chief disciplinary officer. Goodell announced his creation of the position in December 2014 after a series of player suspensions. The officer oversees investigation of player misconduct and any discipline that results from those investigations.

References

External links

1957 births
Living people
American military lawyers
Directors of the Bureau of Alcohol, Tobacco, Firearms and Explosives
United States Attorneys for the District of Minnesota
National Football League executives
University of Minnesota Law School alumni
United States Marine Corps officers
Lawyers from Cincinnati